Magdalena Stoyanova Georgieva (born 7 December 1962 in Plovdiv, Bulgaria) is a rower from  Bulgaria.

She became single sculls world champion in the 1987 World Rowing Championships in Copenhagen, Denmark. A year later, she competed for Bulgaria in the 1988 Summer Olympics held in Seoul, South Korea in the single sculls event where she finished in third place.

References

1962 births
Bulgarian female rowers
Olympic rowers of Bulgaria
Olympic bronze medalists for Bulgaria
Rowers at the 1988 Summer Olympics
Living people
Olympic medalists in rowing
Medalists at the 1988 Summer Olympics
World Rowing Championships medalists for Bulgaria

Sportspeople from Plovdiv